A pizza cutter (also known as a roller blade) is a utensil that is used to cut pizzas.

History
The first pizza cutter in its modern form was invented by David S. Morgan which he patented on September 20, 1892. However, it was not directly meant for cutting pizza but for cutting wallpapers.

"World's Largest" Pizza Cutter is located in Casey, IL in front of The Greathouse of Pizza.

Varieties
There are two main types of pizza cutters.

The most common uses a wheel that rotates in a circle while a person moves the cutter in a direction that they would like to cut the pizza. Many people might use the wheel pizza cutter for other things, including craft work.

The other type is a large curved knife called a mezzaluna (Italian for "half moon"), which is rocked back and forth to cut the pizza. These two types of pizza cutters come in many different sizes.  Some types of mezzalunas (particularly the double-bladed type) are often used to mince herbs or chop vegetables.

References

Kitchen knives
Pizza
19th-century inventions

sv:Kökskniv#Pizzaskärare